Mueang Saraburi is the capital district (amphoe mueang) of Saraburi province, central Thailand.

History
In 1896 when the Northeastern Railway was built and passed by Tambon Pak Phriao, the governor of Saraburi, Phraya Phichai Ronnarong Songkhram moved the capital district from Sao Hai district to the area.

Geography
Neighboring districts are (from the north clockwise) Chaloem Phra Kiat, Kaeng Khoi, Wihan Daeng, Nong Khae, Nong Saeng and Sao Hai.

Mueang Saraburi is an important surface transportation hub. Mittraphap Road begins downtown. The northeastern railway line passes through it.

Administration
The district is divided into 11 sub-districts (tambons), which are further subdivided into 77 villages (mubans). The town (thesaban mueang) Saraburi covers the whole tambon Pak Phriao. The township (thesaban tambon) Phok Phaek covers part of tambon Nong No. Kut Nok Plao and Takut are two recently created townships.

References

Mueang Saraburi